In computing, Envoy was a proprietary portable document file format marketed by WordPerfect Corporation, created as a competitor for Acrobat Pro. It was introduced by Tumbleweed Communications Corporation in 1993 and shipped with WordPerfect Office in March 1994.

An Envoy file could be created by the use of a special printer driver in WordPerfect, and an application for "viewing, manipulating, annotating or printing Envoy files" was included in the WordPerfect Envoy product, together with a "runtime file" that permitted the a viewer to be embedded in Envoy files and enable recipients to have "all the functionality of the full viewer without paying licensing charges". The resulting document could be viewed in a separate viewer application, the Envoy Distributable Viewer, which also worked as a web browser plugin.

Unlike Adobe PDF, the file format was not publicly documented.

Envoy failed to make any headway against PDF, and is largely now unused. Some have reported success in reading Envoy documents by printing to PostScript from the Envoy Distributable Viewer, then converting the PostScript file to a PDF. The PostScript file can also be viewed directly using a viewer such as Ghostscript.

References

External links
Download for Envoy Reader for Windows 95

Page description languages
Media readers